is a Japanese politician of the Democratic Party of Japan, a member of the House of Councillors in the Diet (national legislature). A native of Okayama, she graduated from Okayama University with a master's degree. She was elected to the House of Councillors for the first time in 2007 after serving in the assembly of Okayama Prefecture for two terms since 1999.

She was due to join a new political party, "Kaikaku Club", in 2008, but on August 28, 2008, she withdrew her membership in the new party and reaffirmed her loyalty to the Democratic Party of Japan.

TV appearances
 TV Tackle (TV Asahi) - 31 March 2007
 Hōdō 2001 (Fuji Television) - 12 August 2007
 Kin SMA (TBS) - 29 December 2007
 TV Tackle (TV Asahi) - 31 March 2008

References

External links 
 Official website 

1959 births
Living people
Female members of the House of Councillors (Japan)
Members of the House of Councillors (Japan)
People from Okayama
Democratic Party of Japan politicians